The 1910 Geneva Covenanters football team was an American football team that represented Geneva College as an independent during the 1910 college football season. Led by fourth-year head coach, Arthur McKean, the team compiled a record of 2–5–2.

Schedule

References

Geneva
Geneva Golden Tornadoes football seasons
Geneva Covenanters football